The M Countdown Chart is a record chart on the South Korean Mnet television music program M Countdown. Every week, the show awards the best-performing single on the chart in the country during its live broadcast.

In 2018, 35 singles ranked number one on the chart and 21 music acts were awarded first-place trophies. Two songs collected trophies for three weeks and achieved a triple crown: "Love Scenario" by iKon, and "Ddu-Du Ddu-Du" by Blackpink. Of all releases for the year, only two songs earned a perfect score of 11,000 points: "Fake Love" by BTS and "I Want You" by Shinee.

Scoring system

11 June 2015 – 12 April 2018 
Scoring System: Digital Music Sales (50%), Album Sales (15%), Social Media Score (YouTube official music video views + SNS buzz) (15%), Popularity Score (global fan votes + age range preference) (10%), Mnet Broadcast Score (10%) + SMS Voting Score (10%).

26 April 2018 – 21 May 2020 
Scoring System: Digital Music Sales (45%), Album Sales (15%), Social Media Score (YouTube official music video views + SNS buzz) (20%), Global Fan Votes (10%), Mnet Broadcast Score (10%), SMS Live Vote 10%.

Chart history

References 

2018 in South Korean music
2018 record charts
Lists of number-one songs in South Korea